Mount Townsend, a mountain in the Main Range of the Great Dividing Range, is located in the Snowy Mountains region of New South Wales, Australia.

Although lower than Mount Kosciuszko, Mount Townsend has a more craggy peak and is arguably more dominant than the relatively round-topped Mount Kosciuszko.

The confusion about swapping the names of Mount Kosciuszko and Mount Townsend was straightened out in 1940 by B. T. Dowd, a cartographer and historian of the NSW Lands Department. His study reaffirmed that the mountain named by Strzelecki as Mount Kosciuszko was indeed, as the NSW maps had always shown, Australia's highest summit. When Macarthur's field book of the historical journey was published in 1941 by C. Daley  it further confirmed Dowd's clarification. This means that Targangil, mentioned in Spencer's 1885 article, was the indigenous name of Mount Townsend, not of Mount Kosciuszko.

Mount Townsend has a prominence of only 189m which is relatively low compared to other mountains worldwide. In the more stricter prominence cut off points, the most common of which being the 300m prominence rule, Townsend would not be classified as its own mountain, and instead a subsidiary peak. Due to Australia's much flatter topography than all other continents, a prominence cut off point of 300m is almost never used instead opting for less strict definitions of 50m or 100m when classifying peaks. If using the 300m rule this makes Mount Bogong in Victoria the second highest mountain.

See also

 Australian Alps
 List of mountains of Australia
Second Seven Summits

References 

Townsend
Seven Second Summits
Townsend